Donald R. Zak is an American ecologist, currently the Alexander H. Smith Distinguished University Professor of Ecology and Arthur F. Thurnau Professor  in the School for Environment and Sustainability (SEAS) at University of Michigan and an Elected Fellow of the American Association for the Advancement of Science and the Ecological Society of America.

References

University of Michigan faculty
Living people
21st-century American biologists
Year of birth missing (living people)